Sylvanus Albert Reed (8 April 1854 – 1 October 1935) was an American aerospace engineer who developed the modern metal aircraft propeller.

Early life and career 
Reed Graduated from Columbia University in 1874. He worked as an engineer specializing in electrical signals for railroad safety until retirement in 1912.

Later career
In 1915 Reed experimented with metal propellers using a 10 hp electric engine driving propellers up to 19,000 rpm. He researched propeller shapes and materials that could withstand tip speed up to Mach 1.35. In 1920 he was encouraged by the local police to move his experiments from his attic and rented a shop at the Curtiss aircraft company's Garden City factory. He invented the Reed Metal Propeller, testing it in August 1921 on a Curtiss K-6 powered Standard. It was developed for use on the PW-8 and Curtiss D-12 powered Hawk.  He won the 1925 Collier Trophy for his development of the Reed Aeronautic Propeller. In December 1934 Reed donated an endowment to the Institute of Aeronautical Sciences creating an annual award  for the winner of "Experimental or theoretical investigations have a beneficial influence on the development of practical aeronautics".

In 1881 he became a hereditary member of the Rhode Island Society of the Cincinnati.  Reed died in 1935.

References 

1854 births
1935 deaths
Collier Trophy recipients